William Dudley Foulke (November 20, 1848 – May 30, 1935) was an American literary critic, journalist, poet and reformer.

Biography

William Dudley Foulke was born in New York City on November 20, 1848. He graduated Columbia University in 1869 and Columbia Law School in 1871. He practiced law in New York until 1876, when he moved to Richmond, Indiana, and married Mary Taylor Reeves.

Foulke became involved in local politics and was elected to the Indiana State Senate from 1882 to 1886. As a senator, he introduced bills to reform the state's civil service system. In addition, he investigated abuses against inmates and employees at the state hospital for the insane. He served on the Platform Committee of the Progressive Party. In 1889 he was asked by the National Civil Service Reform League to investigate the U.S. Federal civil service. President Theodore Roosevelt appointed Foulke a Commissioner in the Civil Service Commission in 1901.

He was a critic of the Ku Klux Klan, which had strong membership in Richmond, and was threatened with flogging for his views.

He was also one of the early presidents of the American Woman Suffrage Association, the first president of the Proportional Representation League, and (for five years) president of the National Municipal League.

As a writer, Foulke wrote on a number of diverse subjects. In 1898, he published a biography of Oliver Hazard Perry Morton. Later, he translated the medieval History of the Lombards by Paul the Deacon. Other works include Biographical Introduction to Some Love Poems of Petrarch (1916).

Foulke was a major supporter of the Richmond Group of artists and was one of the founders of the Richmond Art Museum in 1898. He loaned paintings for early exhibitions and donated many works in the museum's permanent collection.

Some of his poems include Honor to France. Foulke wrote two memoirs: Fighting the Spoilsmen (1919), where he recounted his career in fighting for civil service reform. There followed a more general reminiscences, A Hoosier Autobiography (1922).

He died at his home in Richmond on May 30, 1935, and was buried at Spring Grove Cemetery in Cincinnati.

Friend of Russian Freedom
Foulke was interested in Russia and Russian history since the 1880s. He was scared by the encroachments of Russian Empire in Central Asia and in the Far East. He supposed that Russian ambitious foreign politics would be a great menace to "free Institutions". In 1887 he published a pamphlet "Slav or Saxon", showing aggressive intentions of Tsarist regime. In that time he also protested against the ratification of Russian-American Extradition treaty, but all efforts were in vain. In 1893 the treaty was ratified.

In 1903 Foulke became the president of the Society of Friends of Russian Freedom. The society was reestablished in Boston by Alice Stone Blackwell. As Foulke recalled, "this association had no very definite organisation, but acted as occasion offered". Foulke and other notable Americans (Blackwell, Wald, Howe, Addams), who endorsed Russian revolutionists and liberals in their fighting against the autocracy, encouraged Russian emigre Breshko-Breskovskaya in 1904-1905, when she arrived in the USA for tapping moral support and some money.

In popular culture
Foulke appears as a supporting character in Harry Turtledove's alternate history novel series Southern Victory.

Works

Notes

External links

Willian Dudley Foulke Collection, Rare Books and Manuscripts, Indiana State Library

1848 births
1935 deaths
American male journalists
American memoirists
Civil service reform in the United States
Columbia Law School alumni
New York (state) lawyers
Writers from Richmond, Indiana
American suffragists
Indiana state senators
Male feminists
American feminist writers
Burials at Spring Grove Cemetery